Casino is an upcoming Bangladeshi crime film directed by Saikat Nasir, produced by Rajib Sarwar and distributed by Cimplex International Company, the first production for the company. It will star Nirab, Shabnom Bubly and Taskeen Rahman. Abdullah Zahir Babu and Asad Jaman co-writes the screenplay. This will Bubly's first movie not starring Shakib Khan. Principal photography of the film begun on 24 November 2019. The film was scheduled to release in Summer 2020, but the release was postponed due to the COVID-19 pandemic.

Cast 
Following cast has been confirmed via various sources with their character list. Most of the cast is yet to disclose by Saikat Nasir.
 Nirab - A police detective. The lead protagonist.
 Shabnom Bubly - casino girl
 Taskeen Rahman - Juboraj, a casino kingpin. The key antagonist.
 Sadia Rubayet Tanjin - A police assistant.
 Dilruba Hossain Doyel -
 Munim Ehsan - Nepali casino slot attendant.
 Lutfur Rahman Khan Simanto

Production

Development 
Saikat Nasir has been developing this project since June, 2019. He discusses with Nirab about his plan for making 'Casino' as well as various characters for the screenplay . Meanwhile, Abullah Jahir Babu has written the screenplay with Asad for filming. Bubly is contacted and schedules  forSK Films' project  Bir. Bir was set to start filming from November, 2019, but later postponed. Saikat than approached to  Bubly for joining Casino cast. Bubly joined the cast after SK films let her utilize the current schedule for shooting other film. On 10 November 2019, Bubly and Taskeen confirmed their signing to Casino.

Filming and set design 
The film has gone through pre-production set up before principal photography begins. It took one month and seventy people production to replicate a casino, bar and Interpol office inside Bangladesh Film Development Corporation(BFDC) for shooting. In abroad Bali is selected to host the ‘Casino’ team for the shooting of songs. Nasir filmed entire film by three separate schedules. Filming has started on 24 November 2019 the opening scene took places on Neela Market near 300 feet road's Fire Service station. Saikat Nasir secretly filmed the indoor sequences inside the BFDC's Jasim Floor, to avoid the leak any spoiler of this film. Eighty percent filming was completed within 2019. Other than BFDC, outdoor action sequences has taken at Banani, bank of Shitalakshaya river.  On the first week of March, 2020 director has closed the camera for principal photography.

Soundtrack
The film contains the Dhallywood film songs. Channel I confirms Imran Mahmudul, Konal, Sazad Hossain and Marsel's name for lending their voices for Casino songs.

Release 
Casino was set to release in the mid 2020, but was put on hold due to the COVID-19 pandemic.

References 

Upcoming films
Upcoming Bengali-language films
Bengali-language Bangladeshi films
Bangladeshi crime films
Films postponed due to the COVID-19 pandemic